The Office of Australian War Graves (OAWG) is a branch within the Australian Government Department of Veterans' Affairs. The branch was initially a stand-alone agency, formed 1 January 1975. In 1980, the War Graves Act 1980 (Cth) formalised the position of Director War Graves within the Department of Veterans' Affairs. The OAWG acts as Australian agent for the Commonwealth War Graves Commission.

Responsibilities
The responsibilities of the OAWG generally fall within the following five areas.
 Processing of new official commemorations
 Maintenance of war cemeteries, plots, individual graves, post-war commemorations and battle exploit memorials
 Management of major projects at overseas locations
 Provision of research services for commemorative information, and
 Issuing permission to use the relevant Service badge.

The OAWG is also responsible for the maintenance of some 20,000 graves of Commonwealth war dead in 76 war cemeteries & plots and in numerous civil cemeteries, as well as Memorials to the Missing listing over 3,000 names throughout Australia, Norfolk Island, Papua New Guinea and the Solomon Islands.

Directors of War Graves

See also
 Australian War Memorial

Further reading
 In Remembrance: The Work of the Office of Australian War Graves (2010)

References

External links
 Official Site of the Office of Australian War Graves

Commonwealth Government agencies of Australia
Military history of Australia during World War I
Commonwealth War Graves Commission